The Mayor's Residence Art Salon is a former residence in Zhongzheng District, Taipei, Taiwan.

History
The residence building was originally built in 1940 by the Japanese government for the governor's families. It was used as the residence of Taipei mayors until 1994. In 1999, the Department of Cultural Affairs of Taipei City Government outsourced the operation of the building and converted it into an art and cultural center.

Architecture
The building was constructed with Japanese architecture style. The area of the building spans over an area of 990 m2 on a total ground area of 2,640 m2. It is now run as an art and cultural center. It also includes a restaurant and bookshop.

Activities
The venue regularly hosts small art exhibitions.

Transportation
The building is accessible within walking distance south of Shandao Temple Station of Taipei Metro.

See also
 List of tourist attractions in Taiwan

References

External links

 

1940 establishments in Taiwan
Buildings and structures in Taipei
Houses completed in 1940
Art centers in Taipei
Bookstores of Taiwan
Cultural centers in Taipei
Mayors' mansions in Taiwan
Restaurants in Taiwan